is a retired Japanese competitor in synchronized swimming.

She won two silver medals at the 2010 Asian Games and two silver medals at the 2014 Asian Games. She also won two silver medals at the 2014 FINA Synchronized Swimming World Cup.

References

Living people
Japanese synchronized swimmers
1988 births
Sportspeople from Tokyo
Synchronized swimmers at the 2013 World Aquatics Championships
Nihon University alumni
Asian Games silver medalists for Japan
Medalists at the 2010 Asian Games
Medalists at the 2014 Asian Games
Artistic swimmers at the 2010 Asian Games
Artistic swimmers at the 2014 Asian Games
Asian Games medalists in artistic swimming
21st-century Japanese women